Caroline Daniel is a British journalist, political commentator and editor of FT Weekend. She was appointed in June 2010 after having spent three years running the Financial Times comment and analysis pages. In March 2014 she was made consulting editor of FT Live. She is also an FT assistant editor.

Education and career
Daniel was educated at St. Helen's School in London and at Cambridge University, where she studied history. In 1998, Daniel won the Laurence Stern fellowship to The Washington Post. She joined the Financial Times in 1999. Before her appointment, she was a writer for the New Statesman and The Economist, and a researcher for Gordon Brown, the UK Chancellor of the Exchequer.

Between 2005 and 2007, she was the Financial Times''' White House correspondent, based in Washington D. C., during which time she was a regular panellist on The McLaughlin Group and on National Public Radio’s Diane Rehm show. Before moving to Chicago in May 2002, where she led the FT''s coverage of the US airline industry and Boeing, Daniel was based in London as Information Technology correspondent covering the IT boom and bust.

She was research editor for the book "Values, Visions and Voices" (1995) by Gordon Brown and Tony Wright and has had essays published by the IPPR and Demos.

She is a member of the Trilateral Commission, Trustee of the Institute for Public Policy Research and has a Financial Times Non-Executive Director Diploma.

External links
Biography at The McLaughlin Group

British journalists
Living people
People educated at St Helen's School
Year of birth missing (living people)